Popular Manipulations is the third studio album by American band The Districts. It was released in August 2017 under Fat Possum Records. It was recorded partially by Keith Abrams  at Headroom Studios in Philadelphia and by John Congleton.

Track listing

Charts

References

2017 albums
The Districts albums
Fat Possum Records albums